Sandlot may refer to:

 The Sandlot, a 1993 film about young baseball players, and its sequels
 The Sandlot 2, a 2005 film
 The Sandlot: Heading Home, a 2007 film
 Sandlot (company), a  Japanese game developer
 Sandlot Games, developer of Cake Mania
 Sandlot Observatory (H36) in Scranton, Kansas, US
 Sandlot ball, ball game that generally follows the basic rules of baseball